Clamshell may denote anything resembling the bivalve shell of a clam:

 Scoop stretcher, another name for this patient transport device
 Clamshell design, a form factor used for electronic devices, also known as a "flip" or "flip phone".
 Clamshell (container), a design used for storage and food packaging, usually made of plastic or paperboard.
 Clamshell case, a type of box for storing paper items in archives (may also refer to either of the two uses above - electronics or packaging)
 Gallet Clamshell, the world's first water resistant chronograph wristwatch
 Bucket (machine part)#Clamshell bucket, or clamshell bucket
 Clamshell Alliance, an anti-nuclear organization
 Clamshell Falls, a waterfall in Australia